Saurabh Singh may refer to:

Saurabh Singh (cricketer) (born 1997), Indian cricketer
Saurabh Singh (Chhattisgarh politician) (born 1974), Indian politician, member of Legislative Assembly for Akaltara
Saurabh Singh (Uttar Pradesh politician), Indian politician, member of 17th Legislative Assembly, Uttar Pradesh